Nizam's Guaranteed State Railway (NGSR) was a railway company operating in India from 1879 to 1950. It was owned by the Nizams of Hyderabad State, and its full name was His Exalted Highness, The Nizam's Guaranteed State Railway. The company began with a line built privately by the HEH, the Nizam, which was owned and operated by the company under a guarantee from the Hyderabad State, much to the dismay of the British authorities. Capital for the line was raised by issuing redeemable mortgage debentures. The Nizam's railway was eventually consolidated with the Hyderabad-Godavari Valley Railway (HGVR). In 1951, both the NGSR and the HGVR were nationalised and merged into Indian Railways.

History

Nizam's Guaranteed State Railway 

As Hyderabad was one of the largest princely states of India, the 6th Nizam of Hyderabad wanted to build a railway line to connect his realm with the rest of British India (now India). The proposal was for an initial railway line to be built from Secunderabad Railway Station in Hyderabad to Wadi Junction. Nizam agreed to fund the construction expenses for the initial line, leaving subsequent branches to be financed through a variety of means. Construction commenced in 1870, and the Secunderabad-Wadi Line was completed in 1874. Between 1874 and 1889, this line was extended to Kazipet and then to Vijayawada.

In 1879, the Nizam Mahbub Ali Khan, Asaf Jah VI took direct control of the company, integrating it into the state bureaucracy as the state-owned Nizam's Guaranteed State Railway. This partial-nationalisation was reversed in 1883 when a management company was formed to gradually take over the lines, under the provision of a guarantee from the government of HEH, the Nizam of Hyderabad State.

In 1899, the broad gauge connection between Bezwada (Vijayawada) and Madras (Chennai Central) opened, making rail travel between Hyderabad and Chennai possible. The total capital expenditure on the Nizam's State Railway at the end of 1904 was 4.3 crores. In that year, the net earnings were nearly 28 lakhs, or about 6 percent of the outlay.

In 1916, another railway terminus, Kachiguda Railway Station, was built to serve as the railway's headquarters. The Nizam's railway was then divided into various, directly owned subcorporations. Each had a head official appointed by the Nizam's Railway. The profits of these rail lines were distributed by the Nizam's Railway.

Hyderabad-Godavari Valley Railway 

The Hyderabad-Godavari Valley Railway was a  gauge railway. John Wallace Pringle — who had recently completed surveying routes for the Uganda railway — was appointed as the superintending engineer in 1896. The railway opened in 1896, with a  line from Hyderabad city to Manmad Junction. The Hyderabad-Godavari Valley Railways cost 2.6 crores, and earned 7.7 lakhs net in the same year, or nearly 3 percent. In 1901 and 1902 the earnings were about 3 percent.

In the early twentieth century, the cotton industry held an important place in Nizam's Hyderabad Government as the largest export of Hyderabad State. In 1889, a cotton spinning mill and a weaving mill were erected in Aurangabad, employing a total of 700 people. In Jalna alone there were 9 cotton ginning factories and five cotton presses, with two more ginning factories at Aurangabad and Kannad. In 1901, the cotton presses and ginning factories employed a total of 1,016 people. The area of cultivated land under cotton in 1914 was three million acres (12,000 km2), with most of the cotton being grown in the Marathwada districts, where the soil was particularly well suited to it.

Expansion of Cotton industry
The opening of the Hyderabad–Godavari Railway in October 1900 led to the growth of the cotton industry in the Nizamabad, Nander, Parbhani and Aurangabad Districts; the line was used to transport the heavy machinery needed to open ginning and pressing factories. Bombay buyers began to arrive in considerable numbers during the cotton season, which lasted from October to December. More land was turned over to growing cotton and machines replaced the traditional hand gins. Grain and pulses became more expensive, with much of the best land used for cotton farming, and Marathwada entered a critical period of its history.

According to a census report from the period: "The evolution from the agricultural to the manufacturing stage has already begun in Marathwada. When a country begins to produce the raw materials of manufacture in place of food crops, it has started on the road to industrialisation." There were three large spinning and weaving mills and about 90 small ginning and pressing factories in the State. In 1914 69,943 people were employed in cotton spinning, sizing, and 517,750 in weaving, cotton ginning, cleaning, and pressing. The wages paid were good, but the cost of living in Marathwara rose significantly due to the rise of the cotton industry, the uncertainty of rainfall, and availability of credit from money lenders.

Railway lines
The following lines constituted Nizam's Railway:

 Bezwada Extension opened in 1889
 Belharshah-Kazipet opened in 1924
 Karipalli-Kothagudam opened in 1927
 Vikarabad-parli vaijanath-parbhani opened in 1930
 Purna Junction-Hingoli (miles) opened in 1912
 Secunderabad-British Frontier opened in 1916
 Dhone Kurnool (cont. to Madras) opened in 1909
 The Singareni coal fields were served by a branch line from Dornakal Junction covering a distance of

Rail and Road Transport Department 

In 1932, scheduled bus services – under the auspices of the railway administration – began with over 280 miles (450 km) of routes and 27 vehicles. Within a decade, bus service investments became a total expense of 7½ million HRs with nearly 500 vehicles servicing 4475 miles (7200 km) in routes. To coordinate transport policies, the Nizam's State developed a unified Rail and Road Transport Department.  According to historian M.A. Nayeem, the functioning of the railways, roadways and airways under a single department was unique in the world.  As a result, post-1948, Hyderabad State (later Andhra Pradesh) had a significantly superior bus network compared to the rest of India. Other Indian states such as Madhya Pradesh even bought used buses out of Andhra Pradesh. A four-lane highway has now replaced the Nizam-era road from Hyderabad through North India.

Rolling stock 
In 1936 the company owned 173 locomotives, 2 steam railcars, 266 coaches and 4192 goods wagons.

Classification
It was labeled as a Class I railway according to Indian Railway Classification System of 1926.

Merger and later
In 1950, the NGSR and HGVR were nationalised and in 1951 became part of Central Railway, a zone of Indian Railways. It was later re-zoned to South Central Railway, another zone of Indian Railways.

All the metre-gauge lines were gradually converted to the nationwide rail standard,  broad gauge, from 1992 to 2004.

See also 

 Deccan Queen (bus)
 Cyril Lloyd Jones
 Mir Osman Ali Khan
 Mir Mahbub Ali Khan

References

Further reading
 
 
 
 

Companies nationalised by the Government of India
I
 
Defunct railway companies of India
Metre gauge railways in India

South Central Railway zone
Transport in Aurangabad, Maharashtra
Transport in Hyderabad, India
Establishments in Hyderabad State
Railway companies disestablished in 1951
Hyderabad State
Railway companies of India